The South Williamsport Area School District is a small public school district in Lycoming County, Pennsylvania, in the United States. The school serves several suburbs of Williamsport, including South Williamsport, DuBoistown, Susquehanna Township, and Armstrong Township. According to 2000 federal census data, it served a resident population of 9,400. By 2010, the district's population declined to 9,268 people. In 2009, the district residents’ per capita income was $18,650, while the median family income was $41,002. In the Commonwealth, the median family income was $49,501 and the United States median family income was $49,445, in 2010. By 2013, the median household income in the United States rose to $52,100.

The district operates three schools: Central Elementary, Rommelt Elementary, and South Williamsport Jr/Sr High Schools.

Extracurriculars

The South Williamsport Area School District offers a variety of clubs, activities and sports.

Sports
The district funds:

Boys
Baseball - AA
Basketball- AA
Football - A
Golf - AA
Soccer - A
Tennis - AA
Track and field - AA
Wrestling	 - AA

Girls
Basketball - AA
Golf - AA
Soccer (gall) - A
Softball - A
Girls' tennis - AA
Track and field - AA

Junior High School Sports

Boys
Basketball
Football
Soccer
Wrestling	

Girls
Basketball
Soccer (fall)
Softball 

According to PIAA directory July 2012

References

School districts in Lycoming County, Pennsylvania